Hidi is a surname. Notable people with the surname include:

Andre Hidi (born 1960), Canadian ice hockey player
Isli Hidi (born 1980), Albanian footballer
Patrik Hidi (born 1990), Hungarian footballer